José Juan Gutiérrez Rojas (born March 8, 1996, in Toluca, State of Mexico) is a Mexican professional footballer who last played as a forward for UACH F.C.

References

External links
 

1996 births
Living people
People from Toluca
Footballers from the State of Mexico
Association football forwards
Ascenso MX players
Liga Premier de México players
Tercera División de México players
Potros UAEM footballers
UACH F.C. footballers
Mexican footballers